The Journal of Herbal Medicine is a quarterly peer-reviewed medical journal that covers research on herbal medicines. It is an official journal of the National Institute of Medical Herbalists and was established in 2011. The editor-in-chief is Barbara Pendry (National Institute of Medical Herbalists) and it is published by Urban and Fischer. The journal is abstracted and indexed by EMBASE/Excerpta Medica and Scopus.

External links 
 
 Journal page at society's website

Quarterly journals
Elsevier academic journals
Publications established in 2011
English-language journals
Alternative and traditional medicine journals